I Love Hong Kong is a 2011 Hong Kong comedy film produced and directed by Eric Tsang. Film stars Tsang, Tony Leung Ka-fai, Sandra Ng and a star-studded cast of Hong Kong stars. It was released in Chinese New Year Day. The sequel movies are I Love Hong Kong 2012 and I Love Hong Kong 2013.

Cast

Ng family

Other cast

External links
 
 

2011 films
Hong Kong comedy films
2010s Cantonese-language films
2011 comedy films
Shaw Brothers Studio films
Films set in Hong Kong
Films shot in Hong Kong
Films directed by Eric Tsang
Chinese New Year films
2010s Hong Kong films